Gat Cheshmeh (also Romanized as Gach Cheshmeh and Kat Cheshmeh) is a village in Shohada Rural District, Yaneh Sar District, Behshahr County, Mazandaran Province, Iran. At the 2006 census, its population was 176, in 52 families.

References 

Populated places in Behshahr County